Barent Gardenier (July 28, 1776 – January 10, 1822) was an American lawyer and politician from New York. He was a United States representative from 1807 to 1811.

Biography
Barent Gardenier was born in Kinderhook, New York on July 28, 1776. He received a liberal education, studied law at Litchfield Law School and was admitted to the bar. In November 1801 he married Sally (Sarah) Lawrence.

Gardenier practiced in Kingston, New York and was also editor and publisher of a Federalist newspaper, the New York Courier. He was elected as a Federalist to the 10th and 11th United States Congresses, and served from March 4, 1807, to March 3, 1811.

He had a heated controversy with Senator John Armstrong relating to the latter's alleged authorship of the famous Newburgh letters, anonymous circulars in which the author (presumably Armstrong) had attempted unsuccessfully to instigate Continental Army soldiers to act against Congress at the end of the American Revolution in order to secure back pay, pensions and land grants that had been promised but were not immediately forthcoming. Armstrong denied writing the letters, but historians are of the view that Armstrong was the author. By the early 1800s Armstrong was a Democratic-Republican politician and follower of Thomas Jefferson, which caused the Federalist Gardenier to highlight Armstrong's supposed authorship of the Newburgh letters as a campaign issue.

In 1808 Gardenier fought a duel with George W. Campbell, a congressman from Tennessee, resulting from Gardenier's opposition to the Jefferson administration's trade embargo with Great Britain and France. Campbell was angered at Gardenier's speech, and in Gardenier's view included personal insults in his rebuttal speech. Gardenier challenged Campbell, and their duel was notable as being the first to be fought on what became the Bladensburg Dueling Grounds. Gardenier was wounded, but subsequently recovered and won reelection.

From 1813 to 1815, Gardenier was District Attorney of the First District which included New York, Queens, Kings, Suffolk, Richmond and Westchester Counties.

Gardenier died in New York City on January 10, 1822. He is buried at Kingston's First Reformed Church.

Congressional record
His speeches given in the 10th and 11th congresses appear in:

 Abridgement of the Debates of Congress from 1789-1856, D. Appleton & Co. 1857, vol. 3, p. 612.
 The Rep. from N.Y. on building gunboats, pp. 627–629.
 inquiry into conduct of Gen. Wilkinson, 1807; vol. iv. 1808-1813, p. 87.
 re submission to the late edicts of England & France, p. 137.
 on remunerating those who resisted the law for direct tax, p. 139.
 on prosecutions for libel, p. 192.
 re the call on the President (James Madison, 1809) for papers, p. 215.
 supports petition of Elizabeth Hamilton; also referenced on pp. 48, 124, 191, and 350.

References

External links
Biographic sketch at U.S. Congress website
The New York Civil List compiled by Franklin Benjamin Hough (pp. 69 and 448 [Addenda]; Weed, Parsons and Co., 1858)

1776 births
1822 deaths
American people of Dutch descent
New York County District Attorneys
People from Kinderhook, New York
Politicians from Kingston, New York
Litchfield Law School alumni
New York (state) lawyers
Federalist Party members of the United States House of Representatives from New York (state)
American duellists
19th-century American lawyers